Antonio de Ciudad Real was a Franciscan friar, born 1551, in Castilla La Nueva, Spain. At the age of 15, he joined the Convent of San Francisco, in Toledo, Spain. In 1573, he accompanied Diego de Landa, on his second trip to Yucatán, in the Viceroyalty of New Spain. Between 1584 and 1589, he accompanied Alonso Ponce, the commissary general of the Franciscan Order, on his trip from Mexico to Nicaragua, visiting the Franciscan convents of New Spain. A record of this long trip is contained in his work Tratado curioso y docto de las grandezas de la Nueva España. In 1603 he was elected provincial of the Franciscan order. He died on July 5, 1617, in Mérida, Yucatán, Nueva España.

References

External links
 Tratado curioso y docto de las grandezas de la Nueva España 
 Relación de las cosas que le sucedieron al Padre Fray Alonso Ponce Comisario General en las Provincias de Nueva España 

Spanish Franciscans